This is a list of notable footballers who have played for Rangers.

The list includes all players that have appeared in one hundred or more first-team (league, Scottish Cup, Scottish League Cup, Scottish Challenge Cup or European competition) matches for the club which totals 243 current and former players. Further to this, a player can also be included where they are regarded as having played a significant role for the club (e.g. players involved in the 1971–72 Cup Winners' Cup campaign or have been named club captain), but the reason for their inclusion should be indicated in the Notes column. All Rangers Hall of Fame members are denoted by an emboldened name.

For a full list of all Rangers players with Wikipedia articles see Category:Rangers F.C. players. For player appearance records see Rangers F.C. records.

Players should be listed according to the date they first signed with the club. Appearances and goals are for competitive first-team matches only; wartime matches are excluded. Substitute appearances included.

Notable players

Appearances and goals are for first-team competitive matches only, including Scottish league, Scottish Football League, Scottish Cup, League Cup, Challenge Cup, European Cup/Champions League, UEFA Cup/Europa League, Cup Winners' Cup, Inter-Cities Fairs Cup and Super Cup.

Club captains 
Since the club's formation in 1872, over thirty players have permanently held the position of club captain for Rangers. The first was Tom Vallance, from 1876 to 1882. The longest-serving captain is John Greig, who held the role from 1965 until his retirement in 1978. The current club captain is James Tavernier, who took over from Lee Wallace in 2018.

Although many players have held the position of captain during matches – and in many occasions several matches in a row, when the club captain was injured or suspended – this list only includes players that have been officially appointed as the captain of Rangers.

Hall of fame
The Rangers F.C. Hall of fame is a list established in 2000 by the then Rangers chairman, David Murray, the first of any club in Britain. He decided that the club should remember and honour the achievements and contribution made by its finest players throughout its history. A mahogany panel above the famous marble staircase was assigned to display the names of those inducted into the Hall of Fame and an annual presentation ceremony was instigated where the players honoured received their award.

The following criteria are considered by the panel when selecting new members: the individual's service to the club including the number of appearances made, the honours and international caps won whilst with the club and the player's exceptional ability.

The first member elected was Moses McNeil, one of the founders of Rangers.

{| class="wikitable sortable" style="font-size:100%; text-align:center"
!Inductee!!InductionYear!!Position!!RangersCareer!!Appearances!!Honours!! InternationalCaps
|-
| ||2000||MF||1872–1882||34|| ||2
|-
| ||2010||MF||1872–1877||7|| ||0
|-
| ||2010||FW||1872–1879||24|| ||2
|-
| || 2010  ||MF||1872–1876||5||||0
|-
| ||   ||DF||1877–1884||38||||6
|-
| ||   ||FW||1891–1902||281||League title (5), Scottish Cup (3)||9
|-
| ||2011||DF||1892–1904||225||League title (4), Scottish Cup (4)||14
|-
| ||   ||DF||1893–1905||205||League title (4), Scottish Cup (3)||12
|-
| ||2011||MF||1894–1904|| || || 14
|-
| ||2000||MF||1894–1915||481||League title (4)||20
|-
| ||2011||FW||1897–19061907–1908 || || || 11
|-
| ||2007||DF||1907–1920||334||League title (5)||10
|-
| ||2011||MF||1910–1922|| || ||2
|-
| ||2000||MF||1913–1927||457||League title (6)||6
|-
| ||c||FW||1914–1929||389||League title (7), Scottish Cup (1)||12
|-
| || ||DF||1915–1927||218||League title (7)||5
|-
| || ||DF||1917–1926 || || || 0
|-
| || ||MF||1917–19241925–1930||353||League title (8)||8
|-
| ||  ||MF||1917–1934||580||League title (13), Scottish Cup (3)8
|-
| || 2000 ||DF||1919–1936||563||League title (12), Scottish Cup (5) ||15
|-
| || 2000 ||MF||1920–1933||440|| League title (9), Scottish Cup (3)  ||31
|-
| || 2012 ||U||1923–1935|| || League title (5), Scottish Cup (2)  || 8
|-
| ||   ||DF||1925–1947||555|| League title (10), Scottish Cup (6)  ||10
|-
| || 2012  ||FW||1925–1934|| ||  ||3
|-
| ||  2000 || FW|| 1927–1940|| 408|| League title (9), Scottish Cup (6) || 16
|-
| ||2011|| DF|| 1927–1941||  ||  || 14
|-
| ||2010|| DF|| 1929–1941|| 269|| League title (7), Scottish Cup (4) || 19
|-
| ||  || FW|| 1930–1946|| 259||  League title (5), Scottish Cup (3) || 2
|-
| || 2002|| GK|| 1931–1945|| 211||  League title (5), Scottish Cup (2) || 14
|-
| ||2009|| FW|| 1931–1933|| 72 ||  League title (1), Scottish Cup (1) || 2
|-
| ||  || FW|| 1933–19351946–1950|| 140||  League title (1), Scottish Cup (2), League Cup (2) || 5
|-
| ||2006||FW||1933–1946||201||  League title (3), Scottish Cup (2)||3
|-
| || 2000 ||FW<td>1936–1954<td>308||  League title (4), Scottish Cup (3), League Cup (2)4
|-
| ||2000<td>DF<td>1938–1953<td>287<td>  League title (4), Scottish Cup (3), League Cup (2)4
|-
| ||  <td>DF<td>1938–1954<td>329<td>  League title (4), Scottish Cup (3), League Cup (2) 24
|-
| ||2000<td>MF<td>1939–1955<td>301<td>  League title (4), Scottish Cup (2) 17
|-
| ||<td>DF<td>1941–1957<td>428<td>  League title (6), Scottish Cup (4), League Cup (2)53
|-
| ||c<td>DF<td>1945–1960<td>526<td> League title (6), Scottish Cup (5), League Cup (2)14
|-
| ||2002||GK<td>1946–1956<td>296<td> League title (3), Scottish Cup (3), League Cup (2)3
|-
| ||2003<td>MF<td>1946–1955<td>340<td>League title (3), Scottish Cup (2)24
|-
| ||2011<td>GK<td>1947–1961<td>328|| League title (5), Scottish Cup (2), League Cup (1)||0
|-
| ||2008<td>MF<td>1949–1959<td>238<td>L (3), Scottish Cup (1)1
|-
| ||2003<td>FW<td>1950–1959<td>239<td>League title(3), Scottish Cup (1) 12
|-
| ||2012<td>DF<td>1951–1960<td>275|| League title (2), Scottish Cup (2)||1
|-
| ||<td>DF<td>1953–1966||407||League title (5), Scottish Cup (2), League Cup (3)40
|-
| ||2006<td>MF<td>1954–1963<td>331<td>League title(4), Scottish Cup (1), League Cup (2)16
|-
| ||2002<td>FW<td>1954–1965<td>317||League title (4), Scottish Cup (3), League Cup (4)8
|-
| ||2003<td>FW||1955–1967||317||League title (3), Scottish Cup (4), League Cup (3)||2
|-
| || ||DF||1955–1965||407||League title (5), Scottish Cup (3), League Cup (4)||4
|-
| ||2008<td>GK<td>1955–1967<td>339<td>League title (2), Scottish Cup (4), League Cup (3)1
|-
| ||2003<td>MF<td>1956–1967<td>373<td>League title (2), SC (5), League Cup (2)22
|-
| ||2009<td>DF<td>1956–1964<td>261<td>League title (4), Scottish Cup (1), League Cup (2)0
|-
| ||2004<td>DF<td>1958–1970<td>262<td>League title (1), Scottish Cup (3), League Cup (2)5
|-
| ||2010<td>FW<td>1958–1964<td>194<td>League title (2), Scottish Cup (3), League Cup (2)6
|-
| ||2002||MF||1960–1972||426||League title (2), Scottish Cup (4), League Cup (2)29
|-
| ||2004<td>DF<td>1960–1973<td>473<td>League title (2), Scottish Cup (4), League Cup (3)28
|-
| ||2000 <td>MF<td>1960–19651969–1970<td>254<td>League title (3), Scottish Cup (3), League Cup (4)34
|-
| ||2000||DF||1961–1978||755||League title (5), Scottish Cup (6), League Cup (1), European Cup Winners' Cup (1)44
|-
| ||c<td>DF<td>1963–1982<td>506<td>League title (3), Scottish Cup (3), League Cup (5)8
|-
| ||2000||DF||1964–1982||674||League title (3), Scottish Cup (5), League Cup (5), European Cup Winners' Cup (1)34
|-
| ||2002<td>MF<td>1964–19721980–1982<td>393<td>Scottish Cup (1), League Cup (2), European Cup Winners' Cup (1)22
|-
| ||2007<td>DF<td>1964–1975<td>250<td>Scottish Cup (1), European Cup Winners' Cup (1)0
|-
| ||2007<td>DF<td>1966–1974<td>301<td>European Cup Winners' Cup (1)2
|-
| ||2003<td>MF<td>1968–1980<td>503<td>League title (3), Scottish Cup (4), League Cup (4), European Cup Winners' Cup (1)1
|-
| ||2002||FW||1968–19731975–1977||206||League Cup (2), European Cup Winners' Cup (1)21
|-
| ||2007<td>MF<td>1968–1974<td>149<td>Scottish Cup (1), League Cup (1), European Cup Winners' Cup (1)2
|-
| ||c<td>GK<td>1970–1986<td>535<td> League title (1), Scottish Cup (4), League Cup (4), European Cup Winners' Cup (1)4
|-
| ||2010<td>FW<td>1970–1980<td>300<td>League title (2), Scottish Cup (2), League Cup (2)12
|-
| ||c<td>FW<td>1970–19831985–1986<td>546<td>League title (3), Scottish Cup (5), League Cup (5), European Cup Winners' Cup (1)14
|-
| ||2004<td>MF<td>1971–1982<td>452<td>League title (3), Scottish Cup (4), League Cup (3), European Cup Winners' Cup(1)9
|-
| ||2003<td>DF<td>1972–1982<td>326<td>League title (3), Scottish Cup (4), League Cup (2)22
|-
| ||2011||DF||1975–1987|| || || 5
|-
| ||2000<td>MF<td>1977–1989<td>540<td>League title (3), Scottish Cup (3), League Cup (7)24
|-
| ||2006<td>MF<td>1977–1986<td>370<td>League title (1), Scottish Cup (3), League Cup (4)0
|-
| ||2012||DF||1980–19871992–1994<td> 330<td>League title (3), Scottish Cup (1), League Cup (4)27
|-
| ||2000<td>FW<td>1983–1998<td>581<td>League title (9), Scottish Cup (1), League Cup (9)61
|-
| ||2002||MF||1983–1998||347||League title (3), Scottish Cup (3), League Cup (4)||19
|-
| ||2003<td>MF<td>1986–1991<td>73<td>League title (1)54
|-
| ||2002||DF||1986–1990||176||League title (3), League Cup (2)||77
|-
| ||2004<td>GK<td>1986–1991<td>230<td>League title (4), League Cup (3)43
|-
| ||2002||DF||1987–19971997–1998||427||League title (9), Scottish Cup (3), League Cup (6)||61
|-
| ||2006<td>MF<td>1988–2000<td>336<td> League title (10), Scottish Cup (3), League Cup (5)9
|-
| ||2003<td>MF<td>1987–1989<td>96<td> League title (1), League Cup (1)84
|-
| ||2004<td>DF<td>1988–1997<td>278<td> League title (6), Scottish Cup (3), League Cup (3)0
|-
| ||2003<td>FW<td>1990–19951997<td>222<td> League title (5), Scottish Cup (2), League Cup (3)32
|-
| ||2000<td>GK<td>1991–1998<td>260<td>League title (5), Scottish Cup (3), League Cup (2)48
|-
| ||2008<td>MF<td>1991–1998<td>265<td><small> League title (5), Scottish Cup (3), League Cup (2)40</small>
|-
| ||2000MF1994–1998150League title (3), Scottish Cup (1), League Cup (1)75
|-
| ||2003MF1995–1998103League title (2), Scottish Cup (1), League Cup (1) 57
|-
| ||2002||MF||1996–2001||182|| League title (3), Scottish Cup (1), League Cup (2)||3
|-
| ||2004MF1996–20032005–2009431||League title (5), Scottish Cup (5), League Cup (5)45
|-
| ||2010DF1997–2003224||League title (3), Scottish Cup (3), League Cup (3)0
|-
| ||2009GK1998–2007298|| League title (4), Scottish Cup (4), League Cup (2) 0
|-
| ||2014DF2000–2006254||League title (2), Scottish Cup (2), League Cup (3)12
|-
| ||2014FW2004–2010255||League title (3), Scottish Cup (1), League Cup (2)0
|-
| ||2011||DF ||2007–2012 ||215||<small>League title (3), Scottish Cup (2), League Cup (3)|| 69
|-
| ||2014DF2007–2015303||League title (3), Scottish Cup (2), League Cup (3), SL1 (1), SFL3 (1)18
|-
| ||2023||GK||2001–20122018–||493||League title (4), Scottish Cup (4), Scottish League Cup (5)||42
|-
| ||2023||MF||2008–20122019–||371||League title (4), Scottish Cup (3), Scottish League Cup (3)||140
|-
| ||2023||DF||2015-||387||League title (1), Scottish Cup (1), Scottish Championship (1), Scottish Challenge Cup (1)||0
|-
|}

References

External links
 Rangers player history and stats at The Rangers Archive

Rangers F.C. players
Players
 
Players
Rangers
Rangers
Rangers
Association football player non-biographical articles